George Ewart Nixon (March 9, 1898 – March 17, 1981) was a Canadian politician. He represented the electoral district of Algoma West in the House of Commons of Canada from 1940 to 1968. He was a member of the Liberal Party.

External links
 

1898 births
1981 deaths
Liberal Party of Canada MPs
Members of the House of Commons of Canada from Ontario